This is a list of radio stations operating in the Ilocos Region, a part of Luzon island in the Philippines.

Ilocos Norte

AM Stations

FM Stations

Ilocos Sur

AM Stations

FM Stations

La Union

AM Stations

FM Stations

Pangasinan

AM Stations

FM Stations

References

Ilocos Region
Radio stations